Dhairyam is a 2005 Indian Telugu-language film starring Nithiin and Raima Sen in lead roles. The film is directed by Teja and released in February 2005 and it was an average movie at the box office.

Cast

 Nithiin as Seenu
 Raima Sen as Mallika
 Tanikella Bharani as Bonala Bikshapati, Seenu's father 
 Rahman as Somalinga Raju, Mallika's father
 Aishwarya as Mallika's mother
 Tammareddy Chalapathi Rao as Mallika's grandfather
 Suman Shetty
 C. Arunpandian
 Rallapalli
 L. B. Sriram

Soundtrack
The music was composed by Anup Rubens and released by Aditya Music.

References

External links 
 

2000s Telugu-language films